Carnival Cruise Line is an international cruise line with headquarters in Doral, Florida. The company is a subsidiary of Carnival Corporation & plc. Its logo is a funnel shaped like a whale's tail, with a red, white, and blue color scheme. This trademark funnel design is built onto the line's ships. Carnival is ranked first on the list of largest cruise lines based on passengers carried annually.

, Carnival Cruise Line operates a fleet of 24 ships. They have one additional new build on order and a further two ships will join the fleet in 2023 and 2024, following a new joint venture deal between Carnival and Costa.

Company structure
Carnival is one of ten cruise lines owned by the world's largest cruise ship operator, the American-British Carnival Corporation & plc. In 2021, Carnival Cruise Line was estimated to hold a 7.6% share of cruise industry revenue and 18.2% of passengers. It has 24 vessels and is the largest fleet in the Carnival group. The ships fly flags of convenience: 17 of the ships fly the Panama flag and seven that of the Bahamas. Its headquarters are in Miami, Florida, United States. The North American division of Carnival Corporation has executive control over the corporation and is headquartered in Doral, Florida.

History
Carnival Cruise Line was founded in 1972 by Ted Arison. To finance the venture, Arison turned to his friend Meshulam Riklis, who owned Boston-based American International Travel Service (AITS). Arison and Riklis set up the new company as a subsidiary of AITS. AITS was to market and promote the new venture. In 1974, due to regulatory issues, Riklis sold AITS's interest in the company to Arison for $1, but subject to Arison taking over the substantial company debts. The split enabled Arison to enter into new relationships with independent travel agents. He also promoted his cruises to fun-loving younger people. The format was very successful financially.

1970s: Early years 
Carnival Cruise Line commenced sailings from Miami with their first ship the Mardi Gras in 1972, a former transatlantic liner purchased from Canadian Pacific Line. Carnival would adapt and evolve the green Canadian Pacific livery for their new logo, changing the colors to red, white and blue as seen today.

In 1975, Carnival acquired another former Canadian Pacific Line ship, renaming it the Carnivale.  The success of the two ships led to the acquisition of their third ship in 1978, the TSS Festivale, another former ocean liner. With the success of the three ships, Carnival decided to build new ships to be able to compete with the rival Miami cruise lines.

1980s: First new build ships 

In 1982, Carnival introduced their first purpose-built ship, the Tropicale. This was the first ship on which the iconic winged funnel was introduced,  which has since been used on all ships in the fleet; it was designed by Joe Farcus, who would become a longtime Carnival Cruise Line design collaborator.

In 1984, Carnival would introduce a new television marketing campaign during this time, starring Kathie Lee Gifford, who continues to be a longtime collaborator with the line.

Following the success of the Tropicale, and increased competition in Miami with newer ships, Carnival ordered the Holiday in 1985, followed by the Jubilee in 1986 and Celebration in 1987.

1990s: Fleet expansion 

Beginning in 1990, Carnival introduced the popular Fantasy class, beginning with the Fantasy, and completed with the eighth in the class Paradise in 1998. When completed, the Fantasy was one of the largest ships at the time and had the largest atrium at sea. After having done design work on all the previous Carnival ships, Joe Farcus continued as the lead designer for the entire class.

In 1993, Carnival began to get rid of their older second-hand tonnage, and sold their first ship, Mardi Gras, after 21 years of service with the line. The Carnivale followed the same year, going to newly created Carnival subsidiary Fiesta Marina Cruises.

In 1996, the new Destiny class was introduced, with the Carnival Destiny. At  , it became the largest passenger ship in the world at the time and first to exceed 100,000 tons. The Destiny-class platform continued to be used in various iterations all the way to the Carnival Splendor in 2008. The same year the veteran ship Festivale, the last of the original second-hand fleet, was retired.

In 1998, the seventh ship in the Fantasy class, the Elation, was the first cruise ship to have the innovative azipod propulsion, used on most new cruise ships today. The Paradise also debuted in 1998, and was the first completely non-smoking cruise when it originally debuted.

2000s: Early modern era 

In 2001, the new Panamax size Spirit class debuted with the Carnival Spirit, the first of the four-ship class within the Carnival fleet.

In 2001, Robert H. Dickinson, then President and CTC, participated in a BBC documentary, Back To The Floor. Dickinson went to work at the lowest crew levels on the Imagination in the Caribbean, where he shadowed a Romanian cleaner, Alina. In October 2002, Carnival acquired P&O Princess Cruises for 3.5 billion euro.

In 2001, Carnival transferred their first new build, the 1982 built Tropicale to Costa Cruises. Through the rest of the decade, the line would continue to sell, or transfer the other 1980s built ships to other lines, with the Jubilee in 2004, Celebration in 2008, and Holiday in 2009.

In 2004, Carnival Corporation initiated a development program for Carnival's new ships, the Pinnacle Project, calling for a 200,000 GT prototype, which would have been the world's largest cruise ship at the time. The ship was cancelled, but they then developed a project called Next Generation.

In 2009, Carnival released their biggest ship at the time, the Carnival Dream, a new  ship. Carnival Dream entered service on 21 September 2009. After several voyages in the Mediterranean, she was set to offer weekly Caribbean cruises from Port Canaveral from December 5, 2009. A sister ship, Carnival Magic, debuted on May 1, 2011. On December 1, 2009, it was announced that Carnival had placed an order for a third Dream-class vessel. It entered service in June 2012 and its homeport is now Galveston. On May 10, 2010, Carnival selected a name for their new Dream-class vessel in 2012 – Carnival Breeze.

2010s 

On October 26, 2012, it was announced that Carnival had ordered a new 133,500 GT ship. This ship, built by Fincantieri, was the largest ship they have ever built. The new ship was named Carnival Vista, and sailed her maiden voyage on May 1, 2016, from Trieste, Italy.

In January 2017, Michael Thamm was appointed CEO of Carnival Asia to oversee operations in China and the surrounding region.

A sister to Carnival Vista, Carnival Horizon, joined the fleet with her inaugural voyage from Barcelona, Spain on April 2, 2018. Queen Latifah is the ship's godmother, and christened her May 23, 2018.

Carnival Panorama, another sister to Carnival Vista, entered service as the cruise line's flagship on December 11, 2019. She became the first new ship to homeport on the West Coast since Paradise (now Carnival Paradise) in 1998. Both ships sailed from Long Beach, California.

In February 2018, the company's officials unveiled a major port development project in Ensenada, Mexico.

Reports in late June 2019 stated that Carnival was building their first terminal in Japan, in the port city of Sasebo, to be named Uragashira Cruise Terminal. Local officials were hoping that the terminal would be open by late July 2020.

2020s 

In 2020, due to the effects of the COVID-19 pandemic, Carnival Fantasy, Carnival Imagination, Carnival Inspiration were all sold for scrapping. Carnival Fascination was initially sold to another line, only to be resold for scrapping a year later.

In June 2021, it was announced that the Costa Magica would move from Costa Cruises to the Carnival fleet, and would receive a new name and the updated Carnival livery. On the same day, Carnival also announced that an Excel class ship previously under construction for AIDA Cruises would be transferred to Carnival. Later in the year, the name was revealed to be Carnival Jubilee.

On July 31, 2021, after numerous delays, the highly anticipated Mardi Gras entered service, sailing year round from Port Canaveral.

In early 2022, Carnival would announce the retirement of Carnival Sensation and Carnival Ecstasy, with Sensation being sold for recycling immediately, and Ecstasy remaining in the fleet until October 2022.

In June 2022, it was announced that Costa Luminosa would join the fleet as Carnival Luminosa replacing the previous announced plans of moving Costa Magica which would remain with Costa.

It was further announced in June 2022, that Carnival would create a new concept with Costa Cruises, dubbed Costa by Carnival to bring over Costa Venezia and Costa Firenze and have the pair sail under the Carnival brand, while retaining their Costa names and livery. Both ships will join the Carnival fleet in 2023 and 2024 respectively. On October 21, 2022, Carnival released renderings of the ships and announced that the ships would get Carnival names, becoming Carnival Venezia and Carnival Firenze.

In December 2022, Carnival announced it had been forced to delay the debut of Carnival Jubilee from October 2023 to December 2023 because of ongoing supply chain issues at the Meyer Werft shipyard.

Leadership 
Carnival has had five Presidents in its nearly 50-year history.

Effects of COVID-19 pandemic 

In a filing with regulators, the company stated that as of July 31, 2020, it  had $7.9 billion in "cash and cash equivalent" available. An industry news item estimated that this would enable Carnival to continue operating for roughly a year in a situation where none of the ships was sailing. A few days earlier, the company confirmed that it had sold the Carnival Fantasy and Carnival Inspiration (which were to be scrapped) and that Carnival Fascination and Carnival Imagination would move to long term layup (storage).

All cruises were cancelled in March 2020 due to the worldwide pandemic and eventually, 55 passengers on ships owned by Carnival Corporation & plc were reported as having died. In September 2020, the corporation (the corporate umbrella of nine cruise ship companies, including Carnival Cruise Line) announced a reduction in its fleet. The company intended to dispose of 18 of its ships, a full 12% of the group's fleet. By that time, several ships had already been scrapped, including the Carnival Fantasy and Carnival Inspiration. In September 2020, Carnival announced that Carnival Fascination and Carnival Imagination had been sold as well. Carnival Corporation also said that it was delaying the delivery of several ships already on order. The adjusted net loss in the third quarter for Carnival Corporation & plc was reported to the U.S. Securities and Exchange Commission as US$1.7 billion.

As of September 2020, the no-sail rule by the Centers for Disease Control and Prevention prohibited cruising in the U.S. until October 31, 2020, at the earliest. Members of the Cruise Lines International Association, including Carnival Cruise Line, had announced in early August that its members were extending a voluntary suspension until October 31; that applied to cruises that were to depart from the U.S. or planned to stop at U.S. ports of call. On September 16, 2020, Carnival Cruise Line extended the suspension of four of its ships sailings well beyond October to complete required dry-dock enhancements.

Costa Cruises began new sailings on September 6, 2020, in Italy, initially with two ships, Costa Deliziosa and Costa Diadema, At that time, the line required all passengers to be from Italy. By September 27, 2020, however, "Costa Cruises will be available for all European citizens who are residents in any of the countries listed in the most recent decree from the Prime Minister of Italy" according to a news report. The company had implemented strict health protocols to protect its staff and guests.

The Corporate parent's 4th Quarter (ending November 30, 2020) financial statement released on January 11, 2021, indicated that one extra ship, in addition to the 18 previously planned, was to be sold. Carnival Corporation was in an excellent cash position, with US$9.5 billion, but suffered an adjusted net loss of $1.9 billion in the Quarter.

In June 2021, Carnival stock shares fell by 6% after it was announced that some early passengers from the first cruises of 2021 had tested positive for COVID-19.

More recently, as of October 23, 2022, Carnival Cruise line Passengers are not required to provide COVID-19 test prior to their arrival if the passenger is vaccinated and boosted.

Controversies

In the aftermath of Hurricane Katrina, three of the Carnival cruise ships were chartered by the United States government for six months to serve as temporary housing until the houses can be rebuilt. After being chartered for six months, their planned voyages were cancelled, and passengers were refunded. Holiday was originally docked in Mobile, Alabama, and later Pascagoula, Mississippi, and Ecstasy and Sensation were docked at New Orleans, Louisiana.  The six-month contract cost $236 million. The contract was widely criticized, because the vessels were never fully utilized, and Carnival received more money than it would have earned by using the ships in their normal rotation.

Employment
For example, a junior waiter would earn a basic salary of  a month for shifts lasting at least 11 hours, seven days a week. In response to this controversy, the general secretary of the Trades Union Congress, Brendan Barber, commented: "It's high time the disgraceful practice of allowing the shipping industry to pay poverty wages to workers who don't live in the UK was stopped. Exploitative rates of pay for those working on British ships have no place in a modern society." In October 2013, Carnival revoked retirement benefits for cruise staff. In May 2012, Carnival dismissed 150 crew members from India for protesting low wages.

Environmental and pollution
Since 2017, Carnival Corporation has been on probation, after having been found to "illegally dumping oil into the ocean from its Princess Cruises ships and lying about the scheme."  Carnival Corporation also had to pay a $40 million fine. The Court summary states that "Princess was convicted and sentenced in April 2017, after pleading guilty to felony charges stemming from its deliberate dumping of oil-contaminated waste from one of its vessels and intentional acts to cover it up".

In April 2019, Carnival Corporation was accused of violating probation rules. The allegations include 800 incidents from April 2017 to April 2018. A federal judge has threatened to impose severe fines which may increase tenfold. The judge also stated that Carnival ships may be temporarily banned from docking in US ports. In early June 2019, Carnival Corp. agreed to pay $20 million in fines in an agreement with federal prosecutors. The proposed settlement documents were signed by Chairman Micky Arison on June 3, 2019. The next day, a Senior US District Judge approved the deal, and confirmed that probation would continue for three years, after CEO Arnold Donald said, "The company pleads guilty. We acknowledge the shortcomings. I am here today to formulate a plan to fix them". The company promised to implement additional audits to check for violations, to provide improved training to staff, to start improved waste management practices and to set up a more effective method for reporting pollution incidents to government agencies.

In June 2019, Carnival Corporation and its Princess subsidiary agreed to pay a criminal penalty of $20 million for further environmental violations that include dumping plastic waste into the ocean. Princess Cruises had already paid $40 million over prior deliberate acts of ocean pollution.

Accidents and incidents 

On September 19, 1999, Tropicale's engine room caught fire en route from Cozumel to Tampa. While disabled in the Gulf of Mexico, the ship was struck by Tropical Storm Harvey. The Tropicale spent two days without propulsion.

On November 8, 2010, a fire broke out in the generator room of Carnival Splendor and the ship lost power.  The ship was adrift off the west coast of Mexico until it was towed to San Diego.

On February 10, 2013, Carnival Triumph, with 3,143 passengers aboard, suffered an engine room fire, leaving the ship adrift for four days in the Gulf of Mexico. The engine fire led to a power outage on the ship, which in turn caused raw sewage to back up. The media dubbed the ordeal "The Poop Cruise". The ship was towed to Mobile, Alabama, docking on the evening of February 14. In subsequent litigation, Carnival documents were uncovered that revealed multiple generator maintenance problems creating a "disaster waiting to happen". In response, Carnival's court filing stated that the contract that passengers agree to when they buy a ticket "makes absolutely no guarantee for safe passage, a seaworthy vessel, adequate and wholesome food, and sanitary and safe living conditions".

On March 14, 2013, Carnival Dream experienced an emergency generator failure while docked in port at Philipsburg, Sint Maarten. The ship was scheduled to leave port around 5 p.m. ET the day before. The United States Coast Guard said they were notified by Carnival that Carnival Dream was experiencing emergency generator problems. Carnival announced that the passengers would be flown back to Florida rather than completing their scheduled voyage.

On the morning of March 15, 2013, Carnival Legend suffered a mechanical problem with one propulsion pod while at sea.  The cruise line cancelled Carnival Legends scheduled stops in Belize and Grand Cayman, and the ship returned to Tampa, Florida at a reduced speed of 19 knots (22 mph) (Legend has a regular cruising speed of 24 knots).

On December 27, 2015, an electrician who had been working on the Carnival Ecstasy was crushed to death while working in an elevator. The accident had heavy publicity after a video was posted online.

In February 2018, a series of brawls broke out on the Carnival Legend. Staff were criticized for not containing the brawls and for exercising heavy force against passengers.

On May 3, 2018, a pipe burst in the Carnival Dream'''s fire suppression system, flooding 50 staterooms.

In November 2018, the Carnival Sunshine experienced a technical issue which caused the ship to list for approximately one minute.

On December 29, 2018, lifeboat number 28 broke loose from the Carnival Dream for unknown reasons and was damaged. Carnival decided to abandon the lifeboat at sea and purchase a new replacement. No one was on board the lifeboat at the time and no injuries were reported.

In the evening on September 20, 2019, while passing through Panama Canal, the former Carnival Fantasy collided with the lock's wall and sustained damage to the aft superstructure. No injuries were reported. The collision occurred while the lock's water levels were being lowered. The vessel was not under its own power but assisted/tugged by the Panama Canal's locomotives. The accident occurred during the 10-day Panama Canal cruise.

On October 9, 2019, a 23-year-old passenger fell off a railing where he was sitting onto a lower deck while the Carnival Valor was sailing near Louisiana. He was flown to a New Orleans hospital by helicopter and said to be in critical condition.

On December 20, 2019, the Carnival Glory and Carnival Legend collided while in the port of Cozumel, Mexico; The Carnival Glorys stern superstructure was damaged and one person received minor injuries.

On February 16, 2022, a 32-year-old woman leapt from the tenth deck of Carnival Valor after being detained by ship security. The search was suspended by the United States Coast Guard after 14 hours.

On May 26, 2022, the Carnival Freedom suffered a fire within its funnel. The vessel was docked in Grand Turk during the incident. The fire was extinguished with no injuries reported.

On June 28, 2022, the Carnival Magic had a brawl around 5:30 am, arrived at Pier 90 on Manhattan and was greeted by NYPD.

In June 2022, the New York Department of Financial Services announced a US$5 million fine for Carnival due to cybersecurity violations. The department stated that the violations were “significant” and that from 2019 to 2021 Carnival had four security breaches that exposed considerable amounts of consumer data. The department went on to state that Carnival failed to meet security regulation by not using two factor authentication and additionally did not report one of their data breaches.

Ships
Current fleet

Planned future ships

 Former fleet 

See also
Carnival Air Lines, former charter and scheduled airline divisionCarnival Cruise Lines, Inc. v. Shute, a 1991 Supreme Court case about forum selection clausesCarnival Cruise Line Tycoon 2005: Island Hopping, video gameCruise Confidential'', 2008 book
Fiesta Marina Cruises, short-lived subsidiary of Carnival

References

External links

 
1972 establishments in Florida
American companies established in 1972
Carnival Corporation & plc
Companies based in Doral, Florida
Cruise lines
Hospitality companies established in 1972
Travel and holiday companies of the United States